Willis Reuben Brandow (October 16, 1898 – November 20, 1932) was a Canadian professional ice hockey player. He played with the Calgary Tigers, Edmonton Eskimos and Saskatoon Crescents of the Western Canada Hockey League. He also played with the Winnipeg Selkirks in his home province, and later the Duluth Hornets of the American Hockey Association. He was later the coach of the Wisconsin Badgers men's ice hockey program from 1926–27. In 1932, he died in a car accident.

References

External links

1898 births
1932 deaths
Calgary Tigers players
Canadian ice hockey defencemen
Edmonton Eskimos (ice hockey) players
Ice hockey people from Manitoba
Road incident deaths in California
Saskatoon Sheiks players
Sportspeople from Selkirk, Manitoba
Wisconsin Badgers men's ice hockey coaches
Canadian expatriate ice hockey players in the United States